Filip Vujović (born 7 April 1996) is a Montenegrin handball player for Frigoríficos do Morrazo and the Montenegrin national team.

He has represented Montenegro since early 2020, the 2020 European Men's Handball Championship being his first major tournament.

References

External links

1996 births
Living people
Montenegrin male handball players
Sportspeople from Nikšić
Expatriate handball players
Montenegrin expatriate sportspeople in Serbia
Montenegrin expatriate sportspeople in Spain
Liga ASOBAL players